Valmir Aparecido Franci de Campos Júnior (born April 16, 1990 in Capivari), known as Franci, is a Brazilian footballer who plays for Vila Nova as forward.

Career statistics

References

External links

1990 births
Living people
Brazilian footballers
Association football forwards
Campeonato Brasileiro Série B players
Campeonato Brasileiro Série D players
Vitória S.C. players
Joinville Esporte Clube players
Botafogo Futebol Clube (SP) players
J2 League players
Albirex Niigata players